Heptasartorite is a very rare mineral with formula Tl7Pb22As55S108. It belongs to sartorite homologous series. It is related to other recently approved minerals of the series: enneasartorite and hendekasartorite. All three minerals come from a quarry in Lengenbach, Switzerland, which is famous of thallium minerals. Chemically similar minerals include edenharterite and hutchinsonite.

References

Sulfosalt minerals
Thallium minerals
Lead minerals
Arsenic minerals
Monoclinic minerals
Minerals in space group 14